This is a list of Southern Utah Thunderbirds men's basketball head coaches.

Coaching records

References 

Southern Utah